Unlove You may refer to:

 "Unlove You" (Ashley Tisdale song), 2007
 "Unlove You" (Elise Estrada song), 2007
 "Unlove You" (Jennifer Nettles song), 2016